Boche may refer to:
 Boche (slur), a pejorative term for Germans

People 
 Aurélien Boche (born 1981), French footballer
 Bruno Boche (1897–1972), German field hockey player 
 Robert M. Boche (1921–2004), American politician

See also 
 Boch (disambiguation) 
 Boce (disambiguation), for the terms Boće and Boçe
 Bosch (disambiguation)
 Bosh (disambiguation)
 Boshe, a village in China
 Edward Boches, an American academic